Dov Hikind (born June 30, 1950) is an American politician, activist, and radio talk show host in the state of New York.

Hikind is a former Democratic New York State Assemblyman representing Brooklyn's Assembly district 48, having held this position for 35 years – from January 1983 until December 2018.

Background and family
Hikind grew up in a Haredi Jewish family in Williamsburg, Brooklyn, his father being a devout follower of the Vizhnitz Hasidic dynasty. He has a BA from Queens College, and a MA from Brooklyn College.

Hikind is married, and has three children: Yoni, Shmuel, and Deena. Yoni and Shmuel both work as social workers in the Jewish community in Brooklyn.

Politics
Hikind endorsed Michael Bloomberg the first two times he ran for mayor of New York City, then switched his endorsement to the challenger Bill Thompson in the 2009 election. Hikind had broken ranks with his party before, most notably in his endorsement of Republican candidates George Pataki for governor in 1994, George W. Bush, John McCain, Mitt Romney, Donald Trump for president, Inna Vernikov for New York City Council and Lee Zeldin for governor in 2022.

Described by the Jewish Telegraphic Agency and The New York Times as a conservative Democrat, Hikind believes that the national party has moved too far to the left, particularly on social issues, for the liking of many of his constituents. His district had long been one of the most conservative districts in New York City. For instance, it gave Donald Trump 69 percent of the vote in 2016, his second-best showing in the entire state; only the Staten Island-based 62nd Assembly District gave him a higher percentage of the vote. In 2012, it gave Romney 75 percent of the vote, his best showing in the state.

Hikind expressed interest in the special election for the New York's 9th congressional district seat vacated by Anthony Weiner; Hikind did not expect the Democrats to nominate him, and considered running as a Republican.

In 2017, Hikind's son Yoni ran for the City Council in District 44 against Kalman Yeger, David Greenfield's hand-picked successor who was on the Democratic party line; in order to avoid a primary, the younger Hikind collected petitions to run on his own party line called "Our Neighborhood".

In 2018, Hikind retired from the New York State Assembly, proclaiming support for his successor Simcha Eichenstein.

Hikind hosts a weekly radio talk show in New York City.

Views on issues

Israel
Hikind is a pro-Israel activist. In the 1980s he was  a member of the Jewish Defense League, and a follower of Meir Kahane. In an interview  with Robert I. Friedman, Hikind stated that he supported forming a group of "intelligent professionals" to assassinate Nazis and Arab-American supporters of the Palestine Liberation Organization. In 2001, he argued that the Madame Tussauds New York wax museum should remove its wax statue of the Palestinian leader Yassir Arafat, saying that he was a terrorist whose image should not be in New York.

Profiling
Hikind has advocated for the profiling of Muslims of Middle Eastern and South Asian background as a response to terrorism. In 2005, he sponsored a bill to allow police to focus on Middle-Eastern men in subway bag searches. At a news conference, holding up photos of Muslim men, he said: "The individuals involved [in terrorism] basically look like this. Why must police think twice before examining people of a particular group?" He has described this as "terrorist profiling". Civil rights groups opposed Hikind's proposal, and the New York City Police Department released a statement against it, saying that "Racial profiling is illegal, of doubtful effectiveness, and against department policy".

Following the attempted bombing of Northwest Airlines Flight 253 in December 2009, Hikind introduced a similar bill that would allow law enforcement agencies to consider race and ethnicity as "one of many factors" in selecting persons for anti-terrorism stops and searches.

Subway security 
Hikind was instrumental in arranging for the allocation of $1.2 million in a project that helped to install 120 closed-circuit television security cameras in nine South Brooklyn subway stations that are located in Jewish neighborhoods such as Borough Park, Midwood, Kensington, and Parkville. He stated that the project was prompted by "concerns that the Jewish community would be targeted" by terrorists. Hikind encouraged politicians to do the same in other subway stations, which now lag behind those of his community. The New York Times revealed that the Metropolitan Transportation Authority had granted close to $600 million in funds for security to stations in New York City in late 2002; however, only a small fraction of it had been used productively by 2005.

The Passion of the Christ
In 2003, Hikind and a group of supporters protested Mel Gibson's film The Passion of the Christ. He led about 50 Jewish leaders and supporters to the Fox News offices in Manhattan in a demonstration, chanting, "The Passion is a lethal weapon against Jews." Hikind was vocal in his anger against the movie, stating: "It will result in anti-Semitism and bigotry. It really takes us back to the Dark Ages ... the Inquisition, the Crusades, all for the so-called sin of the Crucifixion of Jesus." Hikind said the film "is unhealthy for Jews all over the world."

United Nations
Hikind is part of a group of New York state legislators that has consistently attempted to block plans to renovate the headquarters of the United Nations, calling the UN anti-American and anti-Israel.

Hikind criticized President Barack Obama for abstaining on UN Security Council Resolution 2234, which criticized Israeli settlement activity in the occupied West Bank and East Jerusalem, calling the UN a "cesspool".

Same-sex marriage
After voting against a same-sex marriage bill in the New York State Assembly, Hikind claimed that same-sex marriage can lead to the acceptance of incest, maintaining that, "If we authorize gay marriage in the state of New York, those who want to live and love incestuously will be five steps closer to achieving their goals as well." On June 15, 2011, after the New York State Assembly passed a bill to legalize gay marriage, Hikind said gay marriage is wrong in the eyes of God.

David Irving letter
On October 20, 2009, at the insistence of Hikind and twelve other New York State and City officeholders in a letter to American Express CEO Kenneth Chenault, the company rescinded its Merchants Agreement with prominent Holocaust denier David Irving.

Holocaust high school assignment
In response to what he deemed a "stab in the back to Holocaust survivors", Hikind called for the resignation of New York State Education Commissioner MaryEllen Elia on April 3, 2017, for her support of an Oswego High School assignment that asked students to put themselves in Adolf Hitler's shoes to argue for or against the "Final Solution". Elia had defended the assignment as one that allegedly fostered "critical thinking".

Incidents involving Hikind

Corruption allegations 
In 1997, Hikind was indicted by the U.S. Attorney for allegedly receiving $40,000 in funding from the Council of Jewish Organizations of Borough Park (COJO) in exchange for hundreds of thousands of dollars in state grant money. Hikind was acquitted, while his co-defendant, an official of the organization, Rabbi Elimelech Naiman, was found guilty. The former operations director of COJO, Paul Chernick, pled guilty in a plea agreement.

In 2013, Hikind was alleged to have routinely failed to disclose payments he received from Maimonides Hospital for advertising on his syndicated show. The payments were subsequently investigated by Governor Andrew Cuomo's aborted Moreland Commission.

Hikind was accused of arranging jobs in government for friends and family members. In response, Hikind told the New York Daily News that "I help strangers, and I certainly don't discriminate against members of my family".

Blackface 
Hikind wore blackface, an afro wig and sunglasses during the 2013 Purim celebration, dressing up as what he said was a basketball player. He initially defended his costume decision, pointing to the "anything goes" tradition of Purim, but eventually apologized, saying that he didn't mean to offend anyone. Charles Barron said that Hikind's apology was not enough, asking Sheldon Silver to remove Hikind from his position of assistant majority leader.

Lawsuit against Alexandria Ocasio-Cortez 
Hikind filed a lawsuit against U.S. Representative Alexandria Ocasio-Cortez for blocking him on Twitter. On November 4, 2019, it was announced that they settled the lawsuit, with Ocasio-Cortez issuing a statement apologizing for the block.

References

External links
Assemblyman Dov Hikind's Official blog
"Same as the Old Dov"
"Hikind Stands By Call To Employ Racial Profiling In Subway Searches"
"Opinion Article About Israelis In School Paper Is Denounced"

1950 births
Living people
20th-century American politicians
21st-century American politicians
American Orthodox Jews
American talk radio hosts
American Zionists
Jewish American activists
Jewish American state legislators in New York (state)
Democratic Party members of the New York State Assembly
People from Williamsburg, Brooklyn
Queens College, City University of New York alumni
Vizhnitz (Hasidic dynasty) members